Fruit Tree  is a box set by English singer/songwriter Nick Drake. It exists in several versions, all of which feature his three studio albums, plus additional material.

Versions

There are now three distinct releases of Fruit Tree.

1979 Release
The 1979, release consisted of a box set of three LPs with new artwork. The first two were as listed below. The third was Pink Moon (track listing as below) plus the last four songs of what later (1986 release) became Time of No Reply.

This version was released on Island Records.

1986 Release
The 1986, release was a 4 LP/CD release, and had the track listing as given below. It was released the same year as the separate Time of No Reply album.

This version was released on Hannibal Records.

2007 Release

The 2007, release features Drake's three studio albums (as per the first three albums of the 1986 release), plus A Skin Too Few DVD.

This version was released on Island Records.

Track listing

Disc One: Five Leaves Left
 "Time Has Told Me" – 4:27
 "River Man" – 4:21
 "Three Hours" – 6:16
 "Way to Blue" – 3:05
 "Day Is Done" – 2:22
 "Cello Song" – 3:58
 "The Thoughts of Mary Jane" – 3:12
 "Man in a Shed" – 3:49
 "Fruit Tree" – 4:42
 "Saturday Sun" – 4:00

Disc Two: Bryter Layter
 "Introduction" – 1:33
 "Hazey Jane II" – 3:46
 "At the Chime of a City Clock" – 4:47
 "One of These Things First" – 4:52
 "Hazey Jane I" – 4:31
 "Bryter Layter" – 3:24
 "Fly" – 3:00
 "Poor Boy" – 6:09
 "Northern Sky" – 3:47
 "Sunday" – 3:42

Disc Three: Pink Moon
 "Pink Moon" – 2:06
 "Place to Be" – 2:44
 "Road" – 2:02
 "Which Will" – 2:59
 "Horn" – 1:23
 "Things Behind the Sun" – 3:56
 "Know" – 2:27
 "Free Ride" – 3:36
 "Parasite" – 3:05
 "Harvest Breed" – 1:38
 "From the Morning" – 2:31

Note: In the 3 LP 1979 version, this disc additionally included the last four tracks of the disc below.

Disc Four (1986): Time of No Reply
 "Time of No Reply" – 2:47
 "I Was Made to Love Magic" – 3:28
 "Joey" – 3:06
 "Clothes of Sand" – 2:32
 "Man in a Shed" (Demo) – 3:06
 "Mayfair" – 2:33
 "Fly" (Demo) – 3:37
 "The Thoughts of Mary Jane" (Demo) – 3:46
 "Been Smoking Too Long" – 2:17
 "Strange Meeting II" – 3:38
 "Rider on the Wheel" – 2:33
 "Black Eyed Dog" (Demo) – 3:28
 "Hanging on a Star" – 2:49
 "Voice From the Mountain" – 2:12

Disc Four (2007): A Skin Too Few (DVD)
 Skin Too Few (The Days of Nick Drake) (Biographical film)
 "Introduction"
 "Hazey Jane I"
 "How Wild the Wind Blows"
 "River Man"
 "At the Chime of a City Clock"
 "Day Is Done"
 "Know"
 "Hanging on a Star"
 "From the Morning"
 "Northern Sky"

References 

Nick Drake compilation albums
Albums produced by Joe Boyd
1979 compilation albums
Island Records compilation albums
2007 video albums
Island Records video albums
Hannibal Records albums
Nick Drake video albums